Anine Rabe (born 21 November 1992) is a Norwegian former figure skater. She is a three-time silver medalist at the Norwegian Figure Skating Championships, 2012, 2013 and 2014. She placed 25th in the 2012 World Junior Figure Skating Championships and 42nd in the 2012 World Figure Skating Championships (preliminary round). She retired from competitive skating in 2015. Her younger sister, Thea Rabe is also a former figure skater and ice dancer.

Programs

Competitive highlights 
CS: Challenger Series; JGP: Junior Grand Prix

References

External links 

1992 births
Living people
Sportspeople from Tønsberg
Norwegian female single skaters
21st-century Norwegian women